The following is a list of awards and nominations received by Mexican film director, producer, and screenwriter Alejandro González Iñárritu. His filmography comprises feature films, short films, television and commercials. González Iñárritu has been recognized with multiple awards for his films, including four Academy Awards, three Directors Guild of America Awards, a Producers Guild of America Award, three BAFTA Awards, three AACTA Awards, three Golden Globe Award, two Independent Spirit Awards, two American Film Institute Awards, and three Cannes Film Festival awards.

González Iñárritu is the first Mexican director to be nominated for the Academy Award for Best Director and the Directors Guild of America Award for Outstanding Directing, and the first to win the Best Director Award at the Cannes Film Festival. His six feature films – Amores perros (2000), 21 Grams (2003), Babel (2006), Biutiful (2010), Birdman or (The Unexpected Virtue of Ignorance) (2014), and The Revenant (2015) – received a total of 45 Academy Award nominations. Amores perros and Biutiful received Academy Award, Golden Globe and BAFTA Award nominations for Best Foreign Language Film, with Amores perros winning the BAFTA Award. In 2015, González Iñárritu won the Producers Guild of America Award for Best Theatrical Motion Picture, the Directors Guild Award for Outstanding Directing, and the Academy Award for Best Picture, Best Original Screenplay and Best Director for Birdman, becoming the first Mexican to win three Oscars. In 2016, he won the Academy Award for Best Director for The Revenant, marking the first time in 65 years that a director has won the award in two consecutive years. Iñárritu is the third director to accomplish this feat.

In 2006, González Iñárritu was honored at the Gotham Awards' World Cinema Tribute, alongside fellow Mexican filmmakers Alfonso Cuarón and Guillermo del Toro. In June 2015, González Iñárritu received the Sundance Institute's Vanguard Leadership Award for the "originality and independent spirit" of his films. In November 2015, he was honored by the Los Angeles County Museum of Art at its Art + Film Gala.

Major associations

Academy Awards

British Academy Film Awards

Golden Globe Awards

Industry awards

AACTA Awards

American Film Institute

Directors Guild of America Awards

Independent Spirit Awards

National Board of Review

Producers Guild of America Awards

Satellite Awards

Saturn Award

Film festival awards

Cannes Film Festival

Palm Springs International Film Festival

Venice Film Festival

Critics awards

Critics' Choice Movie Awards

Los Angeles Film Critics Association

See also
 Cha Cha Cha Films

References

External links
 
 Academy Awards Best Director Facts & Trivia at Filmsite.org, AMC

Gonzalez Inarritu, Alejandro